Eslamabad (also Romanized as Eslāmābād; also known as Qal‘eh Eslāmābād and Qal‘eh-ye Mokhtār Khān) is a village in Hana Rural District, in the Central District of Semirom County, Isfahan Province, Iran. At the 2006 census, its population was 326, in 96 families.

References 

Populated places in Semirom County